In their -year history, the Cleveland Cavaliers have selected the following players in the National Basketball Association Draft.

Notes

References
 Cleveland Cavaliers Draft Register at Basketball-Reference.com

 
National Basketball Association draft
draft history